The Alliance for True Democracy was a coalition of the pan-democrats to fight for full universal suffrage in Hong Kong.

It was formed on 21 March 2013 by 12 pan-democratic groups on the basis of the Alliance for Universal Suffrage formed in 2010 and suspended in January 2013 due to the split over strategy on dealing the Beijing government.

The convenor Joseph Cheng Yu-shek, political scientist at the City University and leader of the Power for Democracy said the alliance priority would be to strive for public support in the political reform debate, and to form a consensus proposal by the end of the year.

Membership
It was composed of 27 Legislative Council members from 12 pan-democratic groups including:
 Civic Party
 Democratic Party (Withdrew in 2014)
 Hong Kong Association for Democracy and People's Livelihood
 Hong Kong Professional Teachers' Union
 Hong Kong Social Workers General Union
 Labour Party
 League of Social Democrats
 Neighbourhood and Workers Service Centre
 Neo Democrats
 People Power
 Power for Democracy
 Professional Commons

Proposals

2017 Chief Executive election plan
During the 2014 Hong Kong electoral reform consultation, the Alliance for True Democracy released its "Chief Executive Election Plan" in January 2014 with the support of all 27 pro-democratic Legislative Council members for the 2017 Chief Executive election. The election plan includes three channels for nomination: civil nomination, political party nomination, and nomination by the nominating committee. Civil nomination demands a candidate to secure the signed endorsement of 1% of the registered voters; political party nomination requires a political party receiving 5% or more of the total valid votes in the last Legislative Council direct election. The nominating committee shall not refuse to endorse any civil and political party nominees who meet the legal requirements, such as not less than 40 years old, has no right of abode in any foreign country; political conditions such as “love China, love Hong Kong” and “no confrontations with Beijing” are not acceptable. The Alliance also demands the abolition of the existing stipulation which disallows the Chief Executive belonging to a political party membership.

Legislative election proposals
For the Legislative Council elections, the Scholars Group of the ATD put forward proposals for the transition toward the universal suffrage: For 2016 Legislative Council Election, the Scholars Group suggests:

For the universal suffrage of the Legislative Council, there are two proposals from the Scholar Group:

References

Political organisations based in Hong Kong
Political parties established in 2013
Pro-democracy camp (Hong Kong)